Althea is an English female given name. It is a variation of the Greek name Althaea (Αλθαια), which may be related to Greek  althos ("healing").

Richard Lovelace used the name in a poem ("To Althea, from Prison") that John Milton later alluded to in his own poem "Lycidas".

Notable people 

 Althea Braithwaite (1940–2020), English children's author, illustrator, publisher and glass artist
 Althea Bridges (born 1936), Australian opera singer and music teacher
 Althea Currier (born 1941), American glamor model and actress
 Althea Flynt (1953–1987), fourth wife of Larry Flynt
 Althea Gibson (1927–2003), American female athlete 
 Althea Forrest, one half of vocal duo Althea & Donna
 Althea McNish (1924–2020), British textile designer of Trinidadian origin
 Althea Reinhardt (born 1996), Danish handball player
 Althea Thauberger, Canadian artist
 Althea Wynne (1936–2012), English sculptor
 Althea Rae Janairo, actress aka Tia Carrere
 Altheia Jones-LeCointe,  Trinidadian physician and research scientist, leader of the British Black Panther Movement

See also 
 "Althea", a song on the Grateful Dead studio album Go to Heaven
 Althaea officinalis, a perennial species indigenous to Europe, Western Asia, and North Africa, which is used in herbalism and as an ornamental plant
 Cyclone Althea (1971)
 Ethinylestradiol/cyproterone acetate, a birth control pill with brand name Althea

References 

Feminine given names